Cardinal Newman College is a Catholic sixth form college close to the centre of Preston, Lancashire, England. The college was graded "outstanding" by Ofsted in May 2009. The college was then granted "Beacon College" status by the Learning and Skills Improvement Service in November 2010.

The college was ranked as the best sixth form college in England according to the Sunday Times' analysis of A Level performance for 2011. With nine other high performing sixth form colleges, the college was a founder member of the 'Maple Group' of colleges in March 2013.

The college has undergone significant new build and refurbishment since 2008. This has included the addition of the newly built St Cecilia’s Building in 2009, the acquisition of the St Augustine’s Centre in 2010, and the St Francis Building in 2015, situated next to the St Mary's Building. The most recent addition was the John Henry building.

History
The college contains Lark Hill House, built in 1797 as private house for Samuel Horrocks, a cotton manufacturer and later Mayor and Member of Parliament for Preston. The house was unoccupied after the deaths of both Horrocks in 1842 and his son four years later, until 1860 when it was sold to the Faithful Companions of Jesus Sisters, to become Lark Hill House School for girls.

The house was modified in 1870, with more classrooms added in 1893, 1907, and 1932. The school was a direct grant grammar school from 1919, known as Larkhill Convent Grammar School. From 1967, the school took in sixth form students from other Catholic secondary schools around Preston. The introduction of comprehensive schools in Lancashire forced the school to stop admitting under 16 pupils from 1978.

In that year, the Lark Hill sixth form merged with the sixth forms of the other two Catholic grammar schools in Preston, namely Winckley Square Convent School and Preston Catholic College, to form Cardinal Newman College, named after John Henry Newman. Initially, the sites of all three former schools were used, but within a few years, the college was concentrated at the Lark Hill site.

However, the former Catholic College's playing fields, one mile (1½ km) south of the college, are still used by Newman College.

Football club

At the turn of the 20th century, Newman had a successful football team, and old students often continued to play together after their college years for the nearby Preston Winckley F.C. onwards from 1903, in the Lancashire Amateur League. The league, and subsequently the team, folded in 1911, and led to the creation of a Catholic College Old Boys F.C., changing the name to Newman College F.C. in 1982.

The club has enjoyed varying degrees of success, fielding five teams in 1990/91, but a period of decline saw the club fielding only one team in 2006. A resurgence in recent years has seen the club win the Lancastrian Brigade Cup, with promotion to the Premier division of the Mid Lancashire League and the inclusion of a reserves team following soon after. The club still sports their traditional green and white hoops and after playing on their own Riverside pitch for one hundred years, now play at BAC/EE Preston social and sports club.

Notable former students
 Helen Southworth, former Labour MP for Warrington South
 Sean Haslegrave, professional footballer
 Myles Pearson, Paralympics GB athlete
 Guy Flanagan, actor
 Julie Atherton, actress
 Rae Morris, pop singer songwriter
 Hannah Britland, actress
 Dominic Lyne, author
 Cliff Thorburn, snooker player
 Clifford V. Johnson, physicist

Notes

References
 Garlington, J. (1995, new edition 2006), Images of England: Preston, Nonsuch Publishing, Stroud, 
 Hartley, S. (2006),  , Lancashire County Council, Preston, accessed 11 December 2007

External links 
 Cardinal Newman College Website

Buildings and structures in Preston
Education in Preston
Catholic secondary schools in the Diocese of Lancaster
Sixth form colleges in Lancashire